Patricia Barry (November 16, 1921–October 11, 2016) is an actress remembered for her matriarch roles in soap operas like All My Children, Days of Our Lives, and Guiding Light.

Film and television appearances

 1946: Her Kind of Man as Showgirl (uncredited)
 1946: Two Guys from Milwaukee as Nurse (uncredited)
 1946: Deception as Music Student (uncredited)
 1946: The Beast with Five Fingers as Clara (as Patricia White)
 1946: Humoresque as Fritzie - Bauer's Secretary (uncredited)
 1947: The Man I Love as Chorine (uncredited)
 1947: Cry Wolf as Angela (as Patricia White)
 1947: Variety Girl as Variety Girl (unaccredited)
 1947: When a Girl's Beautiful as Ellen Trennis (Credited as Patricia White)
 1947: Rose of Santa Rosa as Dolores de Garfias (Credited as Patricia White)
 1948: The Wreck of the Hesperus as Deborah Allen (Credited as Patricia White)
 1948: Trapped by Boston Blackie as Joan Howell (Credited as Patricia White)
 1948: Flat Feat (Short) as Mary, Police Operator (Credited as Patricia White)
 1948: Blazing Across the Pecos as Lola Carter (Credited as Patricia White)
 1948: Singin' Spurs as Joan Dennis (Credited as Patricia White)
 1948: Go Chase Yourself (Short) as Co-Ed (Credited as Patricia White)
 1949: Slightly French as Hilda (uncredited)
 1949: Riders of the Whistling Pines as Helen Carter (Credited as Patricia White)
 1949: Manhattan Angel as Maggie Graham (Credited as Patricia White)
 1949: The Undercover Man as Muriel Gordon (Credited as Patricia White)
 1949: Kraft Theatre (TV Series)
 1950: The Tattooed Stranger as Mary Mahan (Credited as Patricia White)
 1950: The Philco-Goodyear Television Playhouse (TV Series)
 1950: Robert Montgomery Presents (Credited as Patricia White)
 1952: Armstrong Circle Theatre (TV Series)
 1952: Man Against Crime (TV Series)
 1954: The Motorola Television Hour (TV Series) as Polly
 1954: Suspense (TV Series)
 1954-1955: First Love (TV Series) as Laurie James
 1955: The Elgin Hour (TV Series) as Betty
 1955-1958: Studio One in Hollywood (TV Series) as Deborah / Ethel Cascade
 1956-1957: Goodyear Playhouse (TV Series) as Grace Barre
 1956-1957: The Alcoa Hour (TV Series) as Grace Barre / Stewardess / Nina
 1957-1958: Matinee Theatre (TV Series) as Sally Collier
 1958: Playhouse 90 (TV Series) as Jordan Baker / Lucille
 1958-1959: Maverick (TV Series) as Jessamy Longacre / Kitty Stillman
 1958-1970: Gunsmoke (TV Series) as Kate Schiller / Laura Rand / Belle
 1959: The Third Man (TV Series) as Miss Page
 1959: 77 Sunset Strip (TV Series) as Audrey King
 1959: Sugarfoot (TV Series) as Doreen Bradley
 1959: Yancy Derringer (TV Series) as Patricia Tappworth
 1959: Westinghouse Desilu Playhouse (TV Series) as Ellie
 1959: Richard Diamond, Private Detective (TV Series) as Claire Powers
 1959: True Story (TV Series) as Lorry
 1959: Laramie (TV Series) as Evie
 1959: Goodyear Theatre (TV Series) as Adie Walker
 1959: Startime (TV Series) as Miss Calhoun
 1959-1960: The Millionaire (TV Series) as Connie Norton Maxwell / Judy Butler
 1959-1960: The Rifleman (TV Series) as Adele Adams / Laurie Hadley
 1959-1962: General Electric Theater (TV Series) as Monica Wheeler / Geraldine Willoughby / Kathy / Sarah Wilson
 1960: Bronco (TV Series) as Amy Carter
 1960: Tales of Wells Fargo as Phyllis Randolph
 1960: Markham (TV Series) as Dr. Miriam Holloway
 1960: Diagnosis: Unknown (TV Series) as Aurora Farnum
 1960: Hong Kong (TV Series) as Maria
 1960-1961: Bachelor Father (TV Series) as Lisa Trent / Melissa Trent
 1960-1961: Outlaws (TV Series) as Laurie Palmer / Aimie Cutter
 1960-1962: My Three Sons (TV Series) as Pamela MacLish - Second Time Around - Chip Off the Old Block
 1960-1962: Thriller (TV Series) as Laurie Palmer / Aimie Cutter
 1960-1963: Rawhide (TV Series) as Abigail Fletcher / Susan Parker
 1960-1963: Perry Mason (TV Series) as Eva Belter / Dorine Hopkins / Janice Atkins
 1960-1963: The Twilight Zone (TV Series) as Ann / Leila
 1961: Zane Grey Theater (TV Series) as Beth Martin
 1961: Michael Shayne (TV Series) as Laura Endicott
 1961: The Americans (TV Series) as Jessica
 1961: The Tall Man (TV Series) as Sylvia
 1961: The Donna Reed Show (TV Series) as Millie Corwin
 1961: Ben Casey (TV Series) as Ruth Reynolds
 1962: Route 66 (TV Series) as Terry Prentiss
 1962: Safe at Home! as Johanna Price
 1962: Walt Disney's Wonderful World of Color (TV Series) as Helen Loomis
 1962-1965: Dr. Kildare (TV Series) as Various Roles (6 episodes)
 1963: The Virginian (TV Series) as Alice Finley
 1963: The Eleventh Hour (TV Series) as Claudeen Lebowski
 1963: Going My Way (TV Series) as Kathryn Fontaine
 1963-1965: The Alfred Hitchcock Hour (TV Series) as Lisa Brisson / Lana Layne / Rosemary 'Peaches' Cassidy
 1964: Destry (TV Series) as Sarah Sprague
 1964: The Farmer's Daughter (TV Series) as Betty Ames
 1964: The DuPont Show of the Week (TV Series) as Alice Adams
 1964: Send Me No Flowers as Linda
 1964: Kitten with a Whip as Vera
 1964: Dear Heart as Mitchell
 1964-1965: Harris Against the World (TV Series) as Kate Harris (Recurring role, 13 episodes)
 1967: The Girl from U.N.C.L.E. (TV Series) as Princess Rapunzel 
 1967: The Green Hornet (TV Series) as Hazel Schmidt / Vina Rose
 1967: Iron Horse (TV Series) as Helen Garth
 1967: The Felony Squad (TV Series) as Ellen Vincent
 1967: The High Chaparral (TV Series) as Melanie Cawthorne
 1967: CBS Playhouse (TV Series) as Sally Lambert
 1967: The Guns of Will Sonnett (TV Series) as Alice Butler
 1967-1975: Insight as Peggy / Bea / Martha Lipton / Mrs. Dilger / Connie Ford / Woman
 1968: Judd for the Defense (TV Series) as Kathryn Storm
 1968: Ironside (TV Series) as Martha Webb
 1969: Mannix (TV Series) as Claire Hanley
 1969: The Flying Nun (TV Series) as Sabrina Lewis
 1970: Crowhaven Farm (TV Movie) as Felicia
 1971: Eddie (TV Movie) as Mrs. Milburn
 1971: The Marriage of a Young Stockbroker as Dr. Sadler
 1971: Monty Nash (TV Series) as Molly (Recurring role, 3 episodes)
 1971: Dead Men Tell No Tales (TV Movie) as Lisa Martin
 1972: The Bold Ones: The Lawyers (TV Series) as Marian Sternwood
 1972-1973: Days of Our Lives (TV Series) as Addie Horton Williams (Recurring role, 4 episodes)
 1973: The Great American Beauty Contest (TV Movie) as Kay Earnshaw
 1975: Police Woman (TV Series) as Mrs. Fontaine
 1975: Columbo (TV Series) as Francine
 1976: Visions (TV Series) as Leonore Bishop
 1977: For Richer, for Poorer (TV Series) as Viola Brewster (1977-1978)
 1977: Charlie's Angels (TV Series) as Millicent Farber
 1978: First, You Cry as Anne
 1979: The French Atlantic Affair (TV Mini-Series) as Bee (Recurring role, 3 episodes)
 1979: Three's Company (TV Series) as Mrs. Claremont
 1980: Bogie (TV Movie) as Zelda O'Moore
 1980: Cheaters (TV Movie)
 1980: A Cry for Love (TV Movie) as Jennifer Harris
 1980: Quincy M.E. (TV Series) as Dr. Hotchkiss
 1981: The Girl on the Edge of Town (TV Movie) as Mrs. Panich
 1981: The Texas Rangers (TV Movie) as Blanche
 1981-2005: All My Children (TV Series) as Peg English (Recurring role, 4 episodes)
 1982: The End of August as Mrs. Merriman
 1983: Twilight Zone: The Movie as Mother (segment "It's a Good Life")
 1984: The Jerk, Too (TV Movie) as Mrs. Van Buren
 1984: Her Life as a Man (TV Movie) as Gloria Rogers
 1985: Evergreen (TV Mini-Series) as Mrs. Lerner
 1985: Finder of Lost Loves (TV Series) as Elaine Mailand
 1985-1987: Guiding Light (TV Series) as Sally 'Miss Sally' Gleason (Main Recurring Role, 11 episodes)
 1986: Simon & Simon (TV Series) as Eleanor Finley
 1987: Nine to Five (TV Series) as Margaret
 1988: For Keeps as Adoption Official
 1988: Aaron's Way (TV Series)
 1989: City Rhythms
 1989: Sea of Love as Older Woman
 1989-1994: Murder, She Wrote (TV Series) as Melanie Venable / Mrs. Belle Pentworth
 1991 Knots Landing (TV Series) as Woman
 1991: Dallas (TV Series) as Janine
 1991: Hunter (TV Series) as Adele Hauser
 1992: She Woke Up (TV Movie) as Marcie Beauchamp
 1992: Invasion of Privacy (Video) as Drama Coach
 1992-1993: Loving (TV Series) as Isabella Alden (Recurring role, 2 episodes)
 1993: Ghostwriter (TV Series) as Lana Barnes (Recurring role, 4 episodes)
 2001: Providence (TV Series) as Margery York-Gladwell - Gobble, Gobble
 2014: Delusional as Older Annie Walton (final film role)

References

Actress filmographies
American filmographies